Valdimir Ferraz Matias Nunes (born 6 October 1989), commonly known as Valdinho, is an Angolan professional footballer who plays as a winger for Vila Meã.

In January 2013, Valdinho signed for Primeira Liga side Gil Vicente.

References

External links
 

1989 births
Living people
People from Benguela Province
Angolan footballers
Association football wingers
Segunda Divisão players
S.C. Freamunde players
Liga Portugal 2 players
Sertanense F.C. players
C.D. Santa Clara players
Primeira Liga players
Gil Vicente F.C. players
U.D. Oliveirense players
C.D. Feirense players
U.D. Vilafranquense players
C.R.D. Libolo players
F.C. Lixa players
AC Vila Meã players
Angolan expatriate footballers
Expatriate footballers in Portugal
Angolan expatriate sportspeople in Portugal